Portsmouth was a 38-gun fourth-rate frigate of the English Royal Navy, originally built for the navy of the Commonwealth of England at Portsmouth, and launched in 1650.

By 1677 her armament had been increased to 46 guns. Portsmouth was blown up in action in 1689.

Notes

References

Lavery, Brian (2003) The Ship of the Line - Volume 1: The development of the battlefleet 1650-1850. Conway Maritime Press. .

Ships of the line of the Royal Navy
1650s ships